A marketing plan may be part of an overall business plan. Solid marketing strategy is the foundation of a well-written marketing plan so that goals may be achieved. While a marketing plan contains a list of actions, without a sound strategic foundation, it is of little use to a business.

Summary

A marketing plan is a comprehensive document or blueprint that outlines the advertising and marketing efforts for the coming year. It describes business activities involved in accomplishing specific marketing objectives within a set time frame. A marketing plan also includes a description of the current marketing position of a business, a discussion of the target market and a description of the marketing mix that a business will use to achieve their marketing goals. A marketing plan has a formal structure, but can be used as a formal or informal document which makes it very flexible. It contains some historical data, future predictions,  and methods or strategies to achieve the marketing objectives. Marketing plans start with the identification of customer needs through a market research and how the business can satisfy these needs while generating an acceptable return. This includes processes such as market situation analysis, action programs, budgets, sales forecasts, strategies and projected financial statements. A marketing plan can also be described as a technique that helps a business to decide on the best use of its resources to achieve corporate objectives. It can also contain a full analysis of the strengths and weaknesses of a company, its organization and its products.

The marketing plan shows the step or actions that will be utilized in order to achieve the plan goals. For example, a marketing plan may include a strategy to increase the business's market share by fifteen percent. The marketing plan would then outline the objectives that need to be achieved in order to reach the fifteen percent increase in the business market share. The marketing plan can be used to describe the methods of applying a company's marketing resources to fulfill marketing objectives. Marketing planning segments the markets, identifies the market position, forecast the market size, and plans a viable market share within each market segment. Marketing planning can also be used to prepare a detailed case for introducing a new product, revamping current marketing strategies for an existing product or put together a company marketing plan to be included in the company corporate or business plan.

Outline

A marketing plan should be based on where a company needs to be at some point in the future. These are some of the most important things that companies need when developing a marketing plan: 
 Market research: Gathering and classifying data about the market the organization is currently in. Examining the market dynamics, patterns, customers, and the current sales volume for the industry as a whole.
 Competition: The marketing plan should identify the organization's competition and the marketing strategies they're employing. The plan should describe how the organization will stick out from its competition and what it will do to become a market leader.
 Market plan strategies: Developing the marketing and promotion strategies that the organization will use. Such strategies may include advertising, direct marketing, training programs, trade shows, website, etc.
 Marketing plan budget: Strategies identified in the marketing plan should be within the budget. Top managers need to revise what they hope to accomplish with the marketing plan, review their current financial situation, and then allocate funding for the marketing plan.
 Marketing goals: The marketing plan should include attainable marketing goals. For example, one goal might be to increase the current client base by 100 over a three-month period.
Marketing Mix: The marketing plan should evaluate the appropriate marketing mix. This includes setting up the marketing 4 Ps: the product, price, place, and promotion. These four elements are modified until the best combination have been found that will cater the needs of the product's customer that would result to the maximum profitability of the company.
 Monitoring of the marketing plan results: The marketing plan should include the process of analyzing the current position of the organization. The organization needs to identify the strategies that are working and those that are not working.

Purpose

One of the main purposes of developing a marketing plan is to set the company on a specific path in marketing. The marketing goals normally aligns itself to the broader company objectives, and the plan shows how they attempt to accomplish the objectives. For example, a new company looking to grow their business will generally have a marketing plan that emphasizes strategies to increase their customer base, and in order to achieve that talent acquisition is essential, and that has to be done in systematic hiring process.There are two paths you can take while making a Marketing Plan and doing Market Research. You can either take it internally or externally. Internal research means that you are working on creating the experience and products better for existing customers, while external research is where you look to find out how to gain new customers. Acquiring marketing share, increasing customer awareness, and building a favorable business image are some of the objectives that can be related to marketing planning. The marketing plan also helps layout the necessary budget and resources needed to achieve the goals stated in the marketing plan. The marketing plan shows what the company is intended to accomplish within the budget and also to make it possible for company executives to assess potential return on the investment of marketing dollars. Different aspects of the marketing plan relate to accountability. The marketing plan is a general responsibility from company leaders and the marketing staff to take the company in a specific direction. After the strategies are laid out and the tasks are developed, each task is assigned to a person or a team for implementation. The assigned roles allows companies to keep track of their milestones and communicate with the teams during the implementation process. The marketing plan works as a blue print to achieve organisational goals. It shows the ways to accomplish objectives. Having a marketing plan helps company leaders to develop and keep an eye on the expectations for their functional areas. For example, if a company's marketing plan goal is to increase sales growth then the company leaders may have to increase their sales staff in stores to help generate more sales.

The marketing plan offers a unique opportunity for a productive discussion between employees and leaders of an organization. It provides good communication within the company. The marketing plan also allows the marketing team to examine their past decisions and understand their results in order to better prepare for the future. It also lets the marketing team to observe and study the environment that they are operating in.

A specific action plan ensures that in the long run, the respective firm is able to assess and monitor the success of its approaches with regards to the new brand introduction, however one of the overlooked issues is how essential the team of the business is. Businesses need qualified people, according to Mcdonald and Wilson (2016), in order to give customers the services and goods they demand. Having top-notch employees will enable the business to run smoothly and expand in line with the objectives of the strategic plan. The company will need a varied group of individuals, including those working in the insurance sector as well as support personnel in marketing and IT. The insurer would need to implement a recruitment solution in this case that would streamline and simplify the hiring process while also enhancing quality, accuracy, and consistency. The automation of the hiring process benefits both the organisation's talent profile and the productivity of the hired staff. The automation of the hiring process enables the business to acquire top talent that is compatible with the requirements necessary for the strategic goal's successful implementation. Furthermore, it helps the insurer to reduce the cost of employing top people while also accelerating the hiring procedure to meet the demands of the strategic plan for growth and revenue development.

Marketing planning aims and objectives
Though it's not clear, behind the corporate objectives, which in themselves offer the main context for the marketing plan, will lie the "corporate mission,"  in turn provides the context for these corporate objectives. In a sales-oriented organization, the marketing planning function designs incentive pay plans to not only motivate and reward frontline staff fairly but also to align marketing activities with corporate mission.  The marketing plan basically aims to make the business provide the solution with the awareness with the expected customers.

This "corporate mission" can be thought of as a definition of what the organization is, or what it does: "Our business is ...". This definition should not be too narrow, or it will constrict the development of the organization; a too rigorous concentration on the view that "We are in the business of making meat-scales," as IBM was during the early 1900s, might have limited its subsequent development into other areas. On the other hand, it should not be too wide or it will become meaningless; "We want to make a profit" is not too helpful in developing specific plans.

Jacob Zimmerem suggested that the definition should cover three dimensions: "customer groups" to be served, "customer needs" to be served, and "technologies" to be used. Thus, the definition of IBM's "corporate mission" in the 1940s might well have been: "We are in the business of handling accounting information [customer need] for the larger US organizations [customer group] by means of punched cards [technology]."

Perhaps the most important factor in successful marketing is the "corporate vision." Surprisingly, it is largely neglected by marketing textbooks, although not by the popular exponents of corporate strategy—indeed, it was perhaps the main theme of the book by Peters and Waterman, in the form of their "Superordinate Goals." "In Search of Excellence" said: "Nothing drives progress like the imagination. The idea precedes the deed." If the organization in general, and its chief executive in particular, has a strong vision of where its future lies, then there is a good chance that the organization will achieve a strong position in its markets (and attain that future). This will be not least because its strategies will be consistent and will be supported by its staff at all levels. In this context, all of IBM's marketing activities were underpinned by its philosophy of "customer service," a vision originally promoted by the charismatic Watson dynasty. The emphasis at this stage is on obtaining a complete and accurate picture.

A "traditional"—albeit product-based—format for a "brand reference book" (or, indeed, a "marketing facts book") was suggested by Godley more than three decades ago:
 Financial data—Facts for this section will come from management accounting, costing and finance sections.
 Product data—From production, research and development.
 Sales and distribution data—Sales, packaging, distribution sections.
 Advertising, sales promotion, merchandising data—Information from these departments.
 Market data and miscellany—From market research, who would in most cases act as a source for this information. His sources of data, however, assume the resources of a very large organization. In most organizations they would be obtained from a much smaller set of people (and not a few of them would be generated by the marketing manager alone).
It is apparent that a marketing audit can be a complex process, but the aim is simple: "it is only to identify those existing (external and internal) factors which will have a significant impact on the future plans of the company." It is clear that the basic material to be input to the marketing audit should be comprehensive. 
Accordingly, the best approach is to accumulate this material continuously, as and when it becomes available; since this avoids the otherwise heavy workload involved in collecting it as part of the regular, typically annual, planning process itself—when time is usually at a premium.
Even so, the first task of this annual process should be to check that the material held in the current facts book or facts files actually is comprehensive and accurate, and can form a sound basis for the marketing audit itself.
The structure of the facts book will be designed to match the specific needs of the organization, but one simple format—suggested by Malcolm McDonald—may be applicable in many cases. This splits the material into three groups:
 Review of the marketing environment. A study of the organization's markets, customers, competitors and the overall economic, political, cultural and technical environment; covering developing trends, as well as the current situation.
 Review of the detailed marketing activity. A study of the company's marketing mix; in terms of the 7 Ps (see below)
 Review of the marketing system. A study of the marketing organization, marketing research systems and the current marketing objectives and strategies. The last of these is too frequently ignored. The marketing system itself needs to be regularly questioned, because the validity of the whole marketing plan is reliant upon the accuracy of the input from this system, and `garbage in, garbage out' applies with a vengeance.
 * Portfolio planning. In addition, the coordinated planning of the individual products and services can contribute towards the balanced portfolio.
 * 80:20 rule. To achieve the maximum impact, the marketing plan must be clear, concise and simple. It needs to concentrate on the 20 percent of products or services, and on the 20 percent of customers, that will account for 80 percent of the volume and 80 percent of the profit.
 * 7 Ps: Product, Place, Price and Promotion, Physical Environment, People, Process. The 7 Ps can sometimes divert attention from the customer, but the framework they offer can be very useful in building the action plans.

It is only at this stage (of deciding the marketing objectives) that the active part of the marketing planning process begins. This next stage in marketing planning is indeed the key to the whole marketing process.
The "marketing objectives" state just where the company intends to be at some specific time in the future. 
James Quinn succinctly defined objectives in general as: Goals (or objectives) state what is to be achieved and when results are to be accomplished, but they do not state "how" the results are to be achieved. They typically relate to what products (or services) will be where in what markets (and must be realistically based on customer behavior in those markets). They are essentially about the match between those "products" and "markets." Objectives for pricing, distribution, advertising and so on are at a lower level, and should not be confused with marketing objectives. They are part of the marketing strategy needed to achieve marketing objectives. To be most effective, objectives should be capable of measurement and therefore "quantifiable." This measurement may be in terms of sales volume, money value, market share, percentage penetration of distribution outlets and so on. An example of such a measurable marketing objective might be "to enter the market with product Y and capture 10 percent of the market by value within one year." As it is quantified it can, within limits, be unequivocally monitored, and corrective action taken as necessary.

The marketing objectives must usually be based, above all, on the organization's financial objectives; converting these financial measurements into the related marketing measurements. He went on to explain his view of the role of "policies," with which strategy is most often confused: "Policies are rules or guidelines that express the 'limits' within which action should occur. "Simplifying somewhat, marketing strategies can be seen as the means, or "game plan," by which marketing objectives will be achieved and, in the framework that appears here, are generally concerned with the 8 Ps. Examples are:
 Price—The amount of money needed to buy products
 Product—The actual product
 Promotion (advertising)—Getting the product known
 Placement—Where the product is sold
 People—Represent the business
 Physical environment—The ambiance, mood, or tone of the environment
 Process—The Value-added services that differentiate the product from the competition (e.g. after-sales service, warranties)
 Packaging—How the product will be protected

In principle, these strategies describe how the objectives will be achieved. The 7 Ps are a useful framework for deciding how a company's resources will be manipulated (strategically) to achieve its objectives. However, the 7 Ps are not the only framework, and may divert attention from other real issues. The focus of a business's strategies must be the objectives of the business— not the process of planning itself. If the 7 Ps fit the business's strategies, then the 7 Ps may be an acceptable framework for that business.
The strategy statement can take the form of a purely verbal description of the strategic options which have been chosen. Alternatively, and perhaps more positively, it might include a structured list of the major options chosen.

One aspect of strategy which is often overlooked is that of "timing." The timing of each element of the strategy is critical. Taking the right action at the wrong time can sometimes be almost as bad as taking the wrong action at the right time. Timing is, therefore, an essential part of any plan; and should normally appear as a schedule of planned activities. Having completed this crucial stage of the planning process, to re-check the feasibility of objectives and strategies in terms of the market share, sales, costs, profits and so on which these demand in practice. As in the rest of the marketing discipline, employ judgment, experience, market research or anything else which helps for conclusions to be seen from all possible angles.

At this stage, overall marketing strategies will need to be developed into detailed plans and program. Although these detailed plans may cover each of the 7 Ps (marketing mix), the focus will vary, depending upon the organization's specific strategies. A product-oriented company will focus its plans for the 7 Ps around each of its products. A market or geographically oriented company will concentrate on each market or geographical area. Each will base its plans upon the detailed needs of its customers, and on the strategies chosen to satisfy these needs. Brochures and Websites are used effectively.

Again, the most important element is, the detailed plans, which spell out exactly what programs and individual activities will carry at the period of the plan (usually over the next year). Without these activities the plan cannot be monitored. These plans must therefore be:
 Clear—They should be an unambiguous statement of 'exactly' what is to be done.
 Quantified—The predicted outcome of each activity should be, as far as possible, quantified, so that its performance can be monitored.
 Focused—The temptation to proliferate activities beyond the numbers which can be realistically controlled should be avoided. The 80:20 Rule applies in this context too.
 Realistic—They should be achievable.
 Agreed—Those who are to implement them should be committed to them, and agree that they are achievable. The resulting plans should become a working document which will guide the campaigns taking place throughout the organization over the period of the plan. If the marketing plan is to work, every exception to it (throughout the year) must be questioned; and the lessons learnt, to be incorporated in the next year's .

Businesses need qualified people, according to Mcdonald and Wilson (2016), in order to give customers the services and goods they demand. Having top-notch employees will enable the business to run smoothly and expand in line with the objectives of the strategic plan. The company will need a varied group of individuals, including those working in the insurance sector as well as support personnel in marketing and IT. The insurer would need to implement a recruitment solution in this case that would streamline and simplify the hiring process while also enhancing quality, accuracy, and consistency. The automation of the hiring process benefits both the organization's talent profile and the productivity of the hired staff.

Content of the marketing plan
A Marketing Plan for a small business typically includes Small Business Administration Description of competitors, including the level of demand for the product or service and the strengths and weaknesses of competitors
 Description of the product or service, including special features
 Marketing budget, including the advertising and promotional plan
 Description of the business location, including advantages and disadvantages for marketing
 Pricing strategy
 Market Segmentation

Medium-sized and large organizations
The main contents of a marketing plan are:
 Executive Summary
 Situational Analysis
 Opportunities / Issue Analysis—SWOT Analysis
 Objectives
 Marketing Strategy
 Action Program (the operational marketing plan itself for the period under review)
 Financial Forecast
 Controls

In detail, a complete marketing plan typically includes:
 Title Page
 Executive Summary
 Current Situation—Macroenvironment
 Economic State
 Legal State
 Governmental State
 Technological State
 Ecological State
 Sociocultural State
 Supply chain State
 Current Situation—Market Analysis
 Market definition
 Market size
 Market segmentation
 Industry structure and strategic groupings
 Porter 5 forces analysis
 Competition and market share
 competitors' strengths and weaknesses
 Market trends
 Current Situation—Consumer Analysis
 Nature of the buying decision
 Participants
 Demographics
Psychographics
 Buyer motivation and expectations
 Loyalty segments
 Current Situation—Internal
 Company Resources
 Finances
 People (workforce)
 Time
 Skills
 Objectives
 Mission statement and Vision statement
 Corporate objectives
 Financial objective
 Marketing objectives
 Long-term objectives
 Description of the basic business philosophy
 Corporate Culture (Organizational Culture)
 Summary of Situation Analysis
 External threats
 External opportunities
 Internal strengths
 Internal weaknesses
 Critical success factors in the industry
 Sustainable competitive advantage
 Marketing Research
 Information requirements
 Research methodology
 Research results
 Marketing Strategy–Product management
 Unique selling proposition (USP)
 Product mix
 Product strengths and weaknesses
 Perceptual mapping
 Product life cycle management and new product development
 Brand name, brand image, and brand equity
 Augmented product
 Product portfolio analysis
 B.C.G. Analysis
 Contribution margin analysis
 G.E. Multi Factoral analysis
 Quality Function Deployment
 Marketing Strategy—segmented marketing actions and market share objectives
 By product
 By customer segment
 By geographical market
 By distribution channel
 Marketing Strategy—Pricing
 Pricing objectives
 Pricing method (e.g.: cost plus, demand based, or competitor indexing)
 Pricing strategy (e.g.: skimming, or penetration)
 Discounts and allowances
 Price elasticity and customer sensitivity
 Price zoning
 break even analysis at various prices
 Marketing Strategy—Promotion
 Promotional goals
 Promotional Mix
 Advertising reach, frequency, flights, theme, and media
 Sales force requirements, techniques, and management
 Sales promotion
 Publicity and public relations
 Electronic Promotion (e.g.: web, or telephone)
 Word of Mouth marketing
 Viral Marketing
 Marketing Strategy—Distribution
 Geographical coverage
 Distribution channels
 Physical distribution and logistics
 Electronic distribution
 Implementation
 Personnel requirements
 Assigning responsibilities
 Giving incentives
 Training on selling methods
 Financial requirements
 Management information systems requirements
 Month-by-month agenda
 Gantt chart using PERT or critical path analysis systems
 Monitoring results and benchmarks
 Adjustment mechanism
 Contingencies (what ifs)
 Financial Summary
 Assumptions
 Pro-forma monthly income statement
 Contribution margin analysis
 Breakeven analysis
 Monte Carlo method
 ISI: Internet Strategic Intelligence
 Scenarios
 Prediction of future scenarios
 Plan of action for each scenario
 Controls
 Performance indicator
 Feedback Mechanisms
 Appendix
 Pictures and specifications of products
 Results from completed research

Measurement of progress

The final stage of any marketing planning process is to establish targets (or standards) so that progress can be monitored. Accordingly, it is important to put both quantities and timescales into the marketing objectives (for example, to capture 20 percent by value of the market within two years) and into the corresponding strategies. Marketers must be ready to update and adapt marketing plans at any time. The marketing plan should define how progress towards objectives will be measured. Managers typically use budgets, schedules and marketing metrics for monitoring and evaluating results. With budget, they can compare planned expenditures with actual expenditures for given period. Schedules allow management to see when tasks were supposed to be completed and when they actually were. Marketing metrics tracks actual outcomes of marketing programs to see whether the company is moving forward towards its objectives (P. Kotler, K.L. Keller).

Other than the above-included contents of a marketing plan, it is also vital to include a specific action plan because planning is not primarily about the plan itself rather its more about the results. The main purpose of a marketing plan is to assess or measure the produced results, as such building, a specific action plan enhances the ability to measure the specific, concrete plans and ensuring there is a follow up of the eventual results.
It is essential to realize that depending on the different types of marketing plans, a specific action plan is vital for it ensures that all the criteria are met from a comprehensive perspective. Case in point, if a firm is launching a new product, it is often vital to craft a marketing plan that will showcase the strategies that will be used in a bid to introduce the platform to the industry. Luckily, the integration of a specific action plan ensures that all the strategies integrated into the marketing plan are met effectively. 

Changes in the environment mean that the forecasts often have to be changed. Along with these, the related plans may well also need to be changed. Continuous monitoring of performance, against predetermined targets, represents a most important aspect of this. However, perhaps even more important is the enforced discipline of a regular formal review. Again, as with forecasts, in many cases the best (most realistic) planning cycle will revolve around a quarterly review. Best of all, at least in terms of the quantifiable aspects of the plans, if not the wealth of backing detail, is probably a quarterly rolling review — planning one full year ahead each new quarter. Of course, this does absorb more planning resource; but it also ensures that the plans embody the latest information, and — with attention focused on them so regularly — forces both the plans and their implementation to be realistic.

Plans only have validity if they are actually used to control the progress of a company: their success lies in their implementation, not in the writing'.

Performance analysis

The most important elements of marketing performance, which are normally tracked, are:

Sales analysis

Most organizations track their sales results; or, in non-profit organizations for example, the number of clients. The more sophisticated track them in terms of 'sales variance'—the deviation from the target figures—which allows a more immediate picture of deviations to become evident.

`Micro-analysis', which is simply the normal management process of investigating detailed problems, then investigates the individual elements (individual products, sales territories, customers and so on) which are failing to meet targets

Market share analysis

Few organizations track market share though it is often an important metric. Though absolute sales might grow in an expanding market, a firm's share of the market can decrease which bodes ill for future sales when the market starts to drop. Where such market share is tracked, there may be a number of aspects which will be followed:
 overall market share
 segment share — that in the specific, targeted segment
 relative share

Expense analysis

The key ratio to watch in this area is usually the `marketing expense to sales ratio'; although this may be broken down into other elements (advertising to sales, sales administration to sales, and so on).

Expense analysis can be defined as a detailed report of all the expenses that a business incurs. It is produced on a monthly, quarterly and yearly basis. It can be dissected into small business subsets to determine how much money each area is costing the company.

In marketing, the marketing expense-to-sales ratio plays an important part in expense analysis because it is used to align marketing spend with industry norms. Marketing expense-to-sales ratio helps the company drive its marketing spend productivity. Marketing expense-to-sales analysis is also included with the sales analysis, market share analysis, financial analysis and market-based scorecard analysis as one of the five analysis tools marketers used to control and drive spending productivity. The marketing expense-to-sales ratio allows companies to track actual spending that is relative to the accepted budget and relative to sales goals as stated in the marketing plan.

Financial analysis

The "bottom line" of marketing activities should at least in theory, be the net profit (for all except non-profit organizations, where the comparable emphasis may be on remaining within budgeted costs). There are a number of separate performance figures and key ratios which need to be tracked:
 gross contribution<>net profit
 gross profit<>return on investment
 net contribution<>profit on sales

There can be considerable benefit in comparing these figures with those achieved by other organizations (especially those in the same industry); using, for instance, the figures which can be obtained (in the UK) from `The Centre for Interfirm Comparison'. The most sophisticated use of this approach, however, is typically by those making use of PIMS (Profit Impact of Management Strategies), initiated by the General Electric Company and then developed by Harvard Business School, but now run by the Strategic Planning Institute.

The above performance analyses concentrate on the quantitative measures which are directly related to short-term performance. But there are a number of indirect measures, essentially tracking customer attitudes, which can also indicate the organization's performance in terms of its longer-term marketing strengths and may accordingly be even more important indicators. Some useful measures are:
 market research — including customer panels (which are used to track changes over time)
 lost business — the orders which were lost because, for example, the stock was not available or the product did not meet the customer's exact requirements
 customer complaints — how many customers complain about the products or services, or the organization itself, and about what

Use of marketing plans

A formal, written marketing plan is essential; in that it provides an unambiguous reference point for activities throughout the planning period. However, perhaps the most important benefit of these plans is the planning process itself. This typically offers a unique opportunity, a forum, for information-rich and productively focused discussions between the various managers involved. The plan, together with the associated discussions, then provides an agreed context for their subsequent management activities, even for those not described in the plan itself. Additionally, marketing plans are included in business plans, offering data showing investors how the company will grow and most importantly, how they will get a return on investment.

Budgets as managerial tools

The classic quantification of a marketing plan appears in the form of budgets. Because these are so rigorously quantified, they are particularly important. They should, thus, represent an unequivocal projection of actions and expected results. What is more, they should be capable of being monitored accurately; and, indeed, performance against budget is the main (regular) management review process.

The purpose of a marketing budget is to pull together all the revenues and costs involved in marketing into one comprehensive document. The budget is a managerial tool that balances what is needed to be spent against what can be afforded, and helps make choices about priorities. A budget can further be used to measure a business's performance in the general trends of a business's spending.

The marketing budget is usually the most powerful tool by which one can determine the relationship between desired results and available means. Its starting point should be the marketing strategies and plans, which have already been formulated in the marketing plan itself; although, in practice, the two will run in parallel and will interact. At the very least, a thorough budget may cause a change in the more optimistic elements of a company's business plans.

See also
 Business plan
 Marketing
 Marketing management
 Strategic management
 Product differentiation

References

Further reading 
 H. A. Simon, "Rational decision making in business organisations," American Economic Review
 J. Pfeffer and G. R. Salancik, The External Control of Organizations
 K. Paolo Sumagaysay, "The oversaturated world"

Business planning
Marketing analytics